Genesee, derived from the Seneca word for "pleasant valley", may refer to:

Geographic features

Canada 
Genesee, Alberta, an unincorporated community

United States 
Genesee, California
Genesee, Colorado
Genesee County, Michigan
Genesee County, New York
Genesee Falls, New York, a town
Genesee, Idaho
Genesee Theatre, Waukegan, Illinois
Genesee, Lansing, Michigan, a neighborhood in Lansing, Michigan
Genesee, Wisconsin, a town
Genesee Depot, Wisconsin, an unincorporated community
Genesee, Seattle, a neighborhood in West Seattle, Washington
Genesee Park (Seattle), a park in the Rainier Valley neighborhood of Seattle, Washington
Genesee River, a river in north central Pennsylvania and western New York
Genesee Township, Whiteside County, Illinois
Genesee Township, Michigan
Genesee Township, Potter County, Pennsylvania
Genesee, New York, a town
Genesee College,  New York state
Genesee Valley Greenway, a rail trail in western New York state
Genesee Valley Park, New York

Products and companies
Genesee Brewing Company, a Rochester, New York, brewery
Genesee Cream Ale, one of the brewery's brands
The Genesee Farmer,  an agriculture and horticulture periodical established in 1831
Genesee Country Village and Museum, a 19th-century living history museum located in New York
Genesee and Wyoming Railroad, a railroad in western New York that operated from the 1890s to 2003
Genesee Valley Canal Railroad, a railroad in western New York state in the U.S.
Genesee Valley Transportation Company, parent company of multiple New York state and Pennsylvania short-line railroads
Genesee & Wyoming, a railroad operating company based in Greenwich, Connecticut in the U.S.
Genesee (automobile), a prototype car built in Batavia, New York in 1911

Other uses
 Genesee (train), a named passenger train of the United States, operated by the New York Central Railroad
 Abbey of the Genesee, a Trappist monastic community in upstate New York.
 , several ships of the United States Navy

People with the surname
Fred Genesee, Canadian psychologist and academic
Paul Genesse (born 1973), American writer

See also
Geneseo (disambiguation)